The 1977 UC Davis Aggies football team represented the University of California, Davis as a member of the Far Western Conference (FWC) during the 1977 NCAA Division II football season. Led by eighth-year head coach Jim Sochor, UC Davis compiled an overall record of 11–1 with a mark of 5–0 in conference play, winning the FWC title for the seventh consecutive season. 1977 was the eighth consecutive winning season for the Aggies. With the 5–0 conference record, they stretched their conference winning streak to 23 games dating back to the 1973 season. UC Davis advanced to the NCAA Division II Football Championship for the first time, where they defeated  quarterfinals before losing to eventual national champion Lehigh in the semifinal Knute Rockne Bowl. UC Davis outscored its opponents 335 to 159 for the season. The Aggies played home games at Toomey Field in Davis, California.

Schedule

References

UC Davis
UC Davis Aggies football seasons
Northern California Athletic Conference football champion seasons
UC Davis Aggies football